Tangerine Bank (operating as Tangerine) is a Canadian direct bank that is a subsidiary of Scotiabank. It offers no-fee chequing and savings accounts, Guaranteed Investment Certificates (GICs), mortgages and mutual funds (through a subsidiary). Many savings and investment products are eligible for registration under a Tax-Free Savings Account (TFSA), Registered Retirement Savings Plan (RRSP) or Registered Retirement Income Fund (RRIF).

The bank was founded by ING Group in April 1997 as ING Bank of Canada (operating as ING Direct). In November 2012, it was acquired by Scotiabank. The new name for the bank was revealed in November 2013, and the Tangerine branding was rolled out beginning in April 2014.

Although now wholly owned by Scotiabank, Tangerine remains a separate legal entity and thus kept its unique Institution Number (614), with all accounts being under a single transit number (00152).

History
The predecessor of Tangerine, ING Bank of Canada (using the trade name ING Direct), was founded in April 1997 and operated as a telephone banking service offering savings accounts. It was the first test market for ING Group's direct banking business model, where the aim was to offer more favourable rates to customers by avoiding the costs of running a network of branches. Dutch actor Frederik de Groot served as the company's spokesperson in ING Direct Canada television commercials.

As the bank expanded into online banking, it also grew to offer mortgages, RRSPs, TFSAs, GICs, mutual funds and no-fee chequing accounts. In November 2013, ING Direct Canada claimed over 1.8 million customers, employed almost 1,000 people and held close to $40 billion in total assets.

Acquisition by Scotiabank and name change
In November 2012, Scotiabank completed the acquisition of ING Direct Canada from ING Group, the Netherlands-based parent company of ING Direct Canada, in a CAD$3.1 billion deal first announced in August 2012. As part of the terms of the deal, the bank was required to change its name from ING Direct before May 2014.

On November 5, 2013, ING Direct Canada revealed that its name would be changed to Tangerine in early 2014. The bank stated that the name change was the culmination of a year-long consultation process involving more than 10,000 people in qualitative and quantitative research.

Tangerine continues to use the 'Forward Banking' tagline that had been used by ING Direct Canada from 2012 onwards. Prior to 2012, ING Direct Canada had used the tagline 'Save Your Money'. On November 19, 2015, Tangerine was named by Waterstone Human Capital as one of Canada's 10 Most Admired Corporate Cultures of 2015.

Products and services
Tangerine offers the same services that had been provided by ING Direct Canada, namely savings accounts, chequing accounts, mutual funds and mortgages. Tangerine's mutual funds (marketed as 'portfolios') are based on an indexing strategy, each tracking a weighted combination of three or four equity and/or bond indices.

In 2016, Tangerine began to offer a Mastercard cash-back credit card, which provides customers up to 2% cash back on certain purchases.

Tangerine's banking app is available to customers through iOS, Android, Blackberry and Windows Mobile. Support was also available for Wear OS and Apple Watch but was discontinued on February 29, 2020. The apps allows Tangerine customers to view their account balances and transactions, make transfers, find ABMs and deposit cheques by taking a picture.

As a result of the Scotiabank acquisition, Scotiabank ABMs and those of other banks in the Global ATM Alliance became free for Tangerine customers to use, starting in June 2014. As of September 28, 2014, Tangerine withdrew from The Exchange, its previous network of no-charge ABMs.

Locations
Operating without traditional bank branches, ING Direct Canada instead opened a small network of ING Direct Cafes for its face-to-face contact points. The first café opened in Toronto in 1997, with a further three opening in Vancouver, Montreal and Calgary, as well a second Toronto location.

Under Scotiabank ownership, the bank continued to operate these cafés (rebranded under the Tangerine name). From time to time, the bank also opened temporary pop-up locations to help promote its products.

In its 2020 public accountability statement published in early 2021, Tangerine announced that it had decided to permanently close all of its cafés, except for the Toronto North café located in its head office. All locations had been closed temporarily throughout the COVID-19 pandemic.

See also

 List of banks in Canada
 Alterna Bank
 Alterna Savings
 Motive Financial
 Simplii Financial

References

External links
 Official website

Scotiabank
1997 establishments in Ontario
Canadian companies established in 1997
Banks established in 1997
Banks of Canada
Online banks
Mortgage lenders of Canada
Companies based in Toronto
Financial services brands
Neobanks